The Fire Within is the sixth album by American Yamaha Artist Jennifer Thomas. It was released on 12 October 2018, debuting in the Billboard classical music charts at number 3, at number 2 in the  classical crossover music chart and 25 in the Heatseekers chart.

Development
The album was recorded using Abbey Road Studios London, Opus 4 Studios Bothell, Washington, the Yamaha Entertainment Group Franklin, Tennessee, Glen Gabriel Music Studios Stockholm and at Tickled Ivory Music Home Studios Sequim, Washington. 
Co-produced with Glen Gabriel and mixed by 6-time Grammy award winning Audio engineer Brian Vibberts.

Track listing

 Sources: iTunes and album sleeve notes.

Personnel 
Musicians
 Jennifer Thomas
 Kimberly StarKey, also known as The Rogue Pianist (piano)
 Tina Guo (cello)
 Eurielle (vocals)
 The English Session Orchestra, Abbey Road Studios, London
 Session players from the Ensign Symphony Seattle

Production
Produced by Jennifer Thomas and Glen Gabriel
Orchestration Glen Gabriel
Engineered by Brian Vibberts
Additional engineering by Ryan Nelson
Mastered by Cristofer Stannow

Preview
 In July 2018 the album was previewed with the Ensign Symphony & Chorus at a live Benaroya Hall Seattle concert.

Reviews
 mormonmusic.org
 Sequim Gazette

References

2018 albums
Classical albums
Classical crossover albums